The 1997 MAAC men's basketball tournament was held March 1–3 at the Marine Midland Arena in Buffalo, New York.

Eighth-seeded Fairfield made a cinderella run to win the tournament by defeating  in the championship game, 78–72, to win their first MAAC men's basketball tournament.

The Stags received the conference's automatic bid to the 1997 NCAA tournament as the No. 16 seed in the East region.

Format
All eight of the conference's members participated in the tournament field. They were seeded based on regular season conference records.

All three rounds were played at a neutral site at the Marine Midland Arena in Buffalo, New York.

Bracket

References

MAAC men's basketball tournament
1996–97 Metro Atlantic Athletic Conference men's basketball season
1997 in sports in New York (state)